Nelsonites is a genus of beetles in the family Carabidae, containing the following species:

 Nelsonites jonesei Valentine, 1952
 Nelsonites walteri Valentine, 1952

References

Trechinae